NGC 38 (also known by the designations MCG-1-1-47 or PGC 818) is a spiral galaxy in the constellation Pisces. It was discovered in 1881.

References

External links
 
 

Spiral galaxies
Pisces (constellation)
0038
818
18811025